Mod4Win is a media player for module files written by Kay Bruns. It is skinnable, multi-format freeware. It was one of the first Mod players for the Windows platform.

Mod4Win was first released by Kay Bruns in 1993. Development was suspended in May 1999.

History

The first fully functional model of MOD4WIN was released in September 1993 and it was a pre-release. The first shareware release was done on November 28, 1993. The first commercial version was released on January 14, 1994. The developer released the final beta, version 2.40, as an unrestricted application after development was suspended.

Features

Formats 
 Module formats: Impulse Tracker (IT), Fast Tracker 2 (XM), Oktalyzer (OKT), Scream Tracker 3 (S3M), MultiTracker (MTM), Protracker (MOD), Unreal Music Format (UMX), MO3
 All Amiga formats
 Full archive support for ARJ LHARC (LHA) (LZH) PKZIP ZIP (file format)

References

External links
 

1993 software
Freeware
Streaming software
Windows media players
Windows-only software